Troy Township is one of seven townships in Perry County, Indiana, United States. As of the 2010 census, its population was 11,965 and it contained 5,746 housing units (almost two thirds of the overall county population).

Geography

Cities, towns, villages
 Cannelton
 Tell City
 Troy

Unincorporated towns
(This list is based on USGS data and may include former settlements.)

Cemeteries
The township contains these seven cemeteries: Bolin, Cliff, Greenwood, Log Church, Powell, Saint Michaels and Saint Pius.

Major highways
  Indiana State Road 37
  Indiana State Road 237

Lakes
 Echo Lake
 Fenn Haven Lake

School districts
 Cannelton City Schools
 Tell City-Troy Township School Corporation

Political districts
 State House District 74
 State Senate District 47

References
 
 United States Census Bureau 2009 TIGER/Line Shapefiles
 IndianaMap

External links
 Indiana Township Association
 United Township Association of Indiana
 City-Data.com page for Troy Township

Townships in Perry County, Indiana
Townships in Indiana